Idea art is an art form in which small individual ideas take precedence over grand concepts or ideologies and generic aesthetic, material and disciplinary concerns.  The artist works not only like an architect or an engineer, as in the case of conceptual art, but also like a curator or an art writer.

Works of idea art may be in any medium.

The method was fundamental to Turkish artist Genco Gulan's definition of idea art, one of the first to appear online.

See also

Contemporary art
Experiments in Art and Technology
Found object
Happening
Fluxus
Information art
Installation art
Intermedia
Land art
Modern art
Neo-conceptual art
Net art
Postmodern art
Generative Art
Street installation
Video art
Visual arts
ART/MEDIA

External links
 Widewalls, Contemporary Turkish Artists
 Rhizome.org

Notes and references

Art
Contemporary art movements
Visual arts media
Concepts in aesthetics